Josef Jungmann (5 March 1888 – 20 October 1982) was a Czechoslovak fencer. He competed at four Olympic Games.

International competitions

References

External links
 

1888 births
1982 deaths

Czechoslovak male fencers
Olympic fencers of Czechoslovakia
Fencers at the 1920 Summer Olympics
Fencers at the 1924 Summer Olympics
Fencers at the 1928 Summer Olympics
Fencers at the 1936 Summer Olympics
Sportspeople from Prague